Kaunhara ghat is a river bank in Hajipur in the Indian state of Bihar. Kaunhara ghat is one of the main ghats of the Ganga-Gandak rivers. where worship and cremation have been performed side by side for centuries. Its name stems from a legend, according to which, the fight of Gaja (elephant)–Graah (crocodile), is the reason behind people asking - kaun haara. Lord Vishnu had to interfere to save his devotee Gajaraj from drowning. Both Gaja and Grah were gandharavas. Due to a curse they became Gaja and Graah. Lord Visnu killed Graah to give him instant salvation, and saved Gajaraj. The fight is an emblem for the city, and is prominently depicted on the Hajipur railway station's dome, entry point of Sonepur fair and other notable places.

Since Ganga flows from the west and Gandak from the north, they meet at a right angle (Hindi: konhara). This name was given in the fifth century. Spoken Hindi later evolved and the word changed from Kon to Kaun and Dhara to Hara.

Legend 

Kaunhara ghat is related to the story of two brothers. The elder was humble and a worshiper of Lord Vishnu, while the younger was greedy and bad-natured. They fought over their land. The younger wanted more land than his brother and succeeded, as the elder was more gracious.

In their next reincarnation, elder returned as an elephant while younger became a crocodile. The elephant remained a worshiper of Lord Vishnu and used to bathe early and then pray to Lord VIshnu there. One morning, when he entered the river for bath, the crocodile bit his leg, beginning a long fight. When the elephant was about to lose, he prayed to Lord Vishnu to save him. Lord Vishnu responded by cutting the crocodile into pieces with his Sudarshan chakra. This became known as “Kaun Hara” – “who lost”.

Culture 

People of Hajipur on every pornima and especially during Karthik Purnima. The ghat is decorated for every Chaat puja.

References

External links

Hajipur
Ganges
Ganges basin
Rivers of Bihar
Rivers of Jharkhand
Ghats of India
Rivers of India